The 2009 Sahlen's Six Hours of the Glen was the fifth round of the 2009 Rolex Sports Car Series season. It took place at Watkins Glen International on June 6, 2009.

Race results
Class Winners in bold.

Sahlen's Six Hours of the Glen